Shanastaq-e Sofla (also Romanized as Shanastaq-e Soflá, Shanastgh Sofla, Shanstaq-e Soflá, and Shanstaq Sufla; also known as Shanastaq-e Pā‘īn) is a village in Afshariyeh Rural District, Khorramdasht District, Takestan County, Qazvin Province, Iran. At the 2006 census, its population was 464, in 117 families.

References 

Populated places in Takestan County